Shyade or Tamang Tagi is a woolen cap worn by the Tamang people of Nepal. It is a part of the traditional dress of the community. The hat is unisex and is worn by people of all age groups.

Material 
The cap is usually made of wool, and the shape is typically round and flat at the top. The hat has colorful stripes on the edge and it resembles a hat without the brim. It has various embroideries around the circular part as well as the top. Various religious Buddhist symbols such as Vajra or Endless knot are embraided on the cap.

Usage 
The cap is mostly worn during various social gatherings, festivals such as Sonam Lhosar, and religious and cultural ceremonies. The cap has also become a symbol of the identity of Tamang people in Nepal, where Dhaka topi usually overshadows other traditional headgears.

Gallery

See also 

 Dhaka topi
 Bhaad-gaaule topi
 Birke topi

References 

Nepalese clothing
Hats
Tamang culture